Siege of Lleida took place between 13 May - 30 July 1644 during the Reapers' War when a Spanish force under Felipe da Silva besieged and attacked the Franco-Catalan garrison of the town of Lleida - after intense fighting the town finally surrendered on 30 July.

Philippe de La Mothe-Houdancourt, who failed to lift the Spanish siege was replaced by Henri de Lorraine, count of Harcourt. the Spanish took Balaguer in September and Agramunt in October. After the conquest of Roses, the frontline stabilized for many years, until the Spanish Siege of Barcelona (1651).

Lleida
1644 in Spain
Conflicts in 1644
Lleida 1644
Lleida 1642
Lleida